Castle of San Marcos (also Castillo de Alfonso X El Sabio) is a medieval castle located in El Puerto de Santa María, Cádiz, Spain.  The castle was erected as a fortified church by King Alfonso X of Castile.  It was built on the site of a mosque of which the wall of the qibla survives.

Close to the castle there is a replica of the map of Juan de la Cosa, along with an explanatory plaque; and a little fountain.

Conservation 
The castle was declared a national monument on 30 August 1920 and is currently listed in the Spanish heritage register as a Bien de Interés Cultural.

Gallery

See also 
 List of Bienes de Interés Cultural in Cádiz

References

External links 

Buildings and structures in El Puerto de Santa María
Buildings and structures completed in the 13th century
Castles in Andalusia
Fortified church buildings in Spain
Bien de Interés Cultural landmarks in the Province of Cádiz